is a railway station in Horonobe, Teshio District, Hokkaidō, Japan.

Lines
Hokkaido Railway Company
Sōya Main Line Station W72

Layout
The station contains three tracks, one side platform, and one island platform. Siding with hangars.

Adjacent stations

Stations of Hokkaido Railway Company
Railway stations in Hokkaido Prefecture
Railway stations in Japan opened in 1925